Lake Sachavacayoc (possibly from Quechua sach'awaka tapir, -yuq a suffix) is a lake in Tambopata National Reserve in Peru. It is located in the Madre de Dios Region, Tambopata Province, Tambopata District. The lake lies in a remote area near the Tambopata River.

See also
List of lakes in Peru

References

Lakes of Madre de Dios Region
Lakes of Peru